Joseph Henri Marie de Prémare (17 July 1666 – 17 September 1736) was a Jesuit missionary to China. Born in Cherbourg, he departed for China in 1698, and worked as a missionary in Guangxi.

In 1724, after the Yongzheng Emperor virtually banned Christianity over the Chinese Rites controversy, he was confined with his colleagues in Guangzhou and later banished to Macau, where he died.

His Notitia linguae sinicae, written in 1736 and first published in 1831, was the first important Chinese language grammar in a European language. His letters can be found in the Lettres édifiantes et curieuses de Chine series.

Father de Prémare is among the missionaries who furnished Jean-Baptiste Du Halde with the material for his "Description de la Chine" (Paris, 1735). Among his contributions were translations from the Book of Documents (Du Halde, II, 298); eight odes of the Classic of Poetry (II, 308); and the first translation into a European language of a Chinese drama, "The Orphan of Zhao" (III, 341), titled L'Orphelin de la Maison de Tchao. Premaré sent the translation to Étienne Fourmont, a member of the Académie française. However, the play came into the possession of Father Du Halde instead, who published it in his Description Géographique, Historique, Chronologique, Politique et Physique de l'Empire de la Chine et de la Tartarie Chinois in 1735, although he had no permission from Prémare or Fourmont to do so. Prémare's translation inspired Voltaire's 1753 tragedy L'Orphelin de la Chine.

De Prémare's writings also include a defense of figurism proposed by Joachim Bouvet, which held that the doctrines of Christianity were mystically embodied in the Chinese classics.

Works

Notes

References

 Knud Lundbæk. Joseph De Prémare, 1666-1736, S.J. : Chinese Philology and Figurism. (Aarhus: Aarhus University Press, Acta Jutlandica,  1991). .
 
 
 D. E. Mungello. Curious Land: Jesuit Accommodation and the Origins of Sinology. (Stuttgart: F. Steiner Verlag Wiesbaden, Studia Leibnitiana Supplementa,  1985). Reprinted: Honolulu: University of Hawai'i Press, 1989 .

External links
 

Roman Catholic missionaries in China
17th-century French Jesuits
Jesuit missionaries in China
1666 births
1736 deaths
18th-century French Jesuits
French sinologists
French Roman Catholic missionaries
French expatriates in China
Jesuit missionaries